Philip Till is a talk show host in Vancouver, British Columbia. Since 2005 he has been the a.m. drive-time host of the CKNW Morning News with Philip Till from 5:30 a.m. - 8:30 a.m. He has been a talk show host on CKNW since 1989. Previous to hosting his own show, he co-hosted the afternoon drive time show "The World Today" with Jon McComb, who is the current solo host.

Before arriving in Vancouver he was the foreign editor and chief foreign correspondent NBC radio/TV networks 1970s-1989.

He has announced that his last day with CKNW will be July 31, 2014.

External links 
Vancouver Broadcasters index
CKNW Radio

Living people
Canadian radio personalities
Year of birth missing (living people)